Keith Delane Wortman (born July 20, 1950 in Billings, Montana) is a former offensive lineman who played ten professional seasons in the National Football League. Wortman attended the University of Nebraska. He attended California High School from 1965–68.

References

1950 births
Living people
Sportspeople from Billings, Montana
American football offensive linemen
Nebraska Cornhuskers football players
Green Bay Packers players
St. Louis Cardinals (football) players